Arthur M. Squires (21 March 1916–18 May 2012) was a chemical engineer and member of the Manhattan Project. He was later on the chemical engineering faculties of the City College of New York and Virginia Tech, where he was professor.

He was a native of Neodesha, Kansas, and died at Blacksburg, Virginia. His first degree was from the University of Missouri; his PhD, in physical chemistry, was awarded by Cornell University.

He also wrote several books, including The Tender Ship, which defends his thesis that governments are usually incompetent managers of technology projects.

References

External links
 AtomicHeritage.org Arthur M Squires

1916 births
2012 deaths
American chemical engineers
Manhattan Project people
City College of New York faculty
Virginia Tech faculty
University of Missouri alumni
Cornell University alumni
People from Neodesha, Kansas